The 2017 UAE Super Cup was the 17th and the 10th Professional UAE Super Cup, held at the Baniyas Stadium, Abu Dhabi on 20 January 2018 between Al Jazira, winners of the 2016–17 UAE Pro-League and Al Wahda, winners of 2017–18 UAE President's Cup. Al Wahda won the game 2–0.

Details

See also
2016–17 UAE Pro-League
2016–17 UAE President's Cup

References

External links

UAE Super Cup
UAE Super Cup seasons